Mousie or Mousey may refer to:

Nickname
 Mousey Alexander (1922–1988), American jazz drummer
 Mary Baird (nurse) (1907–2009), Northern Irish nurse and health service administrator nicknamed "Mousie"
 Paul Garner (1909–2004), American actor nicknamed "Mousie"
 Diana Lewis (1919–1997), American actress nicknamed "Mousie", wife of actor William Powell
 Joseph "Mousie" Massimino (born c. 1951), an underboss of the Philadelphia crime family 
 Bruce Strauss (born 1952), American retired boxer called "Mousie" during his school years
 Marcia "Mousie" Williams, a 2007 inductee into the United States Show Jumping Hall of Fame

Other uses
 Mousie, Kentucky, United States, an unincorporated community
 Mousey, a 1974 Canadian film
 Mousie, a character in the 1993 American film Mi Vida Loca
 Mousie, winner of the 1868 Prix Vanteaux French horse race

Lists of people by nickname